Baghatur (Baγatur, Khalkha Mongolian: Баатар Bātar; ; ; ; ;) is a historical Turkic and Mongol honorific title, in origin a term for "hero" or "valiant warrior". The Papal envoy Plano Carpini (-1252) compared the title with the equivalent of European Knighthood.

The word was common among the Mongols and became especially widespread, as an honorific title, in the Mongol Empire in the 13th century; the title persisted in its successor-states, and later came to be adopted also as a regnal title in the Ilkhanate and the Timurid dynasty, among others.

It is also preserved in the modern Turkic and Mongol languages as Altai Баатыр (Baatïr), Turkish Batur/Bahadır, Tatar and Kazakh Батыр (Batyr), Uzbek Batyr and Mongolian Baatar (as in Ulaanbaatar).

The concept of the Baghatur has its roots in Turco-Mongol folklore. Like the bogatyrs of Russian traditional tales, Baghaturs were heroes of extraordinary courage, fearlessness, and decisiveness, often portrayed as being descended from heaven and capable of performing extraordinary deeds. Baghatur was the heroic ideal Turco-Mongol warriors strove to live up to, hence its use as a military honorific of glory.

Etymology

The term was first used by the steppe peoples to the north and west of China proper as early as the 7th century as evidenced in Sui dynasty records. It is attested for the Second Turkic Khaganate in the 8th century, and among the Bulgars of the First Bulgarian Empire in the 9th century. Some authors claim Iranian origin of the word,  the first syllable is very likely the Iranian title word *bag "god, lord".

List of individuals with this title
The term Baghatur and its variants – Bahadur, Bagatur, or Baghadur, was adopted by the following historical individuals:
Modun, the founding chanyu of the Xiongnu empire.
Tonyukuk, military commander of Second Turkic Khaganate. 
Bagatur Bagaina Sevar, 9th century commander in First Bulgarian Empire
Alogobotur, 10th century commander in the First Bulgarian Empire
Bartan Baghatur, the Borjigin Prince and Grandfather of Genghis Khan
Yesugei, the father of Genghis Khan, is called Yesugei Baghatur
The Mongol general Subutai is referred to in the Secret History of the Mongols as baghatur.
Ilkhan Abu Sa'id Bahadur Khan took the title Ba'atur after his name for his victory over the rebellion of the Mongol Keraits in Iran.
Bayan of the Merkid, the Grand councillor of the Yuan dynasty, was awarded Baghatur for his merit during the Ogedeid-Yuan conflict.
Two Mughal emperors were named Bahadur Shah: Bahadur Shah I and Bahadur Shah Zafar II.
Banda Singh Bahadur, Sikh warrior and general
Altani, daughter of Genghis Khan
Stephen IX Báthory (1533–1586), Prince of Transylvania, and King of Poland and Grand Duke of Lithuania.
Erdeni Batur, founder of the Dzungar Khanate.
Abulghazi, ruler of the Khanate of Khiva, had the title of Bahadur Khan. He wrote the famous epic of the Mongols called the genealogical tree of the Mongols (or General history of Tatars).
Maharajadhiraj Mirza Maharao Sri Sir Khengarji III Sawai Bahadur -  the ruler of Kutch, was the first ruler of Princely State of Cutch to be given title of Sawai Bahadur.
Maharajadhiraj Mirza Maharao Sri Vijayaraji Khengarji Sawai Bahadur -  the ruler of Kutch, used Bahadur as a hereditary title.
Maharajadhiraj Mirza Maharao Sri Madansinhji Vijayaraji Sawai Bahadur - the ruler of Kutch, used Bahadur as a hereditary title.
Field Marshal Sam Manekshaw, the second Indian soldier to be so honored, was known as "Sam Bahadur."
Damdin Sükhbaatar, was a founding member of the Mongolian People's Party and leader of the Mongolian partisan army that liberated Khüree during the Outer Mongolian Revolution of 1921. Enshrined as the "Father of Mongolia's Revolution", he is remembered as one of the most important figures in Mongolia's struggle for independence.
Ospan Batyr

See also
 Bahadır
 Baturu
 Bey
 Mete
 Metehan

Notes

References

Brook, Kevin Alan. The Jews of Khazaria. 2nd ed. Rowman & Littlefield Publishers, Inc., 2006.
Grousset, R. The Empire of the Steppes: A History of Central Asia. Rutgers Univ. Press, 1988.
Saunders, J. The History of the Mongol Conquests. Univ. of Penn. Press, 2001.

Turkish titles
Honorary titles
Mongol Empire
Chinese royal titles
Bulgarian noble titles
Titles of the Göktürks